Deborah Hall Eddy is a former Democratic member of the Washington House of Representatives, who represented the 48th district from 2007 to 2013. , she was a member of the Growth Management Hearings Board, appointed to a six-year term on the board by Governor Jay Inslee in 2016. Active in local government since 1990, Eddy has served as mayor and on the Kirkland city council and on various regional boards and commissions. She is an adjunct professor at Seattle University's School of Law on metropolitan governance structures.

Family
Representative Eddy lives in Kirkland, Washington with her husband, Jon Eddy. They have three grown children and four grandchildren.

Education
J.D. from the University of North Carolina, 1979
B.S from West Virginia University, 1976

Professional Background
Suburban Cities Association, Executive Director
Cascadia Center for Regional Transportation, Senior Fellow

Community involvement
Eastside Domestic Violence Program, Founding Board Member
Municipal League of Seattle-King County, Board Member
Washington Appleseed, founding Board Member
Helped establish Kirkland Alliance of Neighborhoods
Previous Public Service Includes
Councilmember and Mayor of Kirkland
Seattle-King County Public Health Board
Regional Water Quality Committee
Various regional committees and task forces

References

External links
Washington State Legislature - Rep. Deborah Eddy Official Washington State House of Representatives website
Project Vote Smart - Representative Deborah H. Eddy (WA) profile
Washington Appleseed - Board of Directors profile of Eddy
Eastside Domestic Violence Program
Municipal League of King County
Follow the Money - Deborah Eddy
2006 campaign contributions

Year of birth missing (living people)
Living people
Democratic Party members of the Washington House of Representatives
Women state legislators in Washington (state)
People from Kirkland, Washington
West Virginia University alumni
University of North Carolina School of Law alumni
Mayors of places in Washington (state)
Washington (state) city council members
Women city councillors in Washington (state)
21st-century American women